The Tarlis incident was the killing of 17 ethnically Bulgarian peasants by a Greek officer on July 27, 1924, at Tarlis (present-day Vathytopos), a mountainous village in the Kato Nevrokopi region near the Greco-Bulgarian border.

Background
Tarlis (Τърлис), Loftsa (Ловча) and Karakioi (Каракьой) were three ethnically Bulgarian villages that had remained inside Greek territory after the Greco-Bulgarian border had been drawn in accordance with the Treaty of Bucharest in 1913.

Out of a total population of 800, only 50 individuals were ethnically Greek—recently settled refugees from the population exchange between Greece and Turkey.

Martial law had been imposed in Greece by the Themistoklis Sophoulis government that took office three days earlier, on July 24, 1924.

Incident
Official Greek reports stated that in the evening of Saturday, July 26, 1924, residents of Tarlis had gathered in the village's square discussing the issue of repatriation between Greece and Bulgaria according to the 1919 Treaty of Neuilly, which provided for the voluntary exchange of populations between Greece and Bulgaria. The deadline for issuing resettlement admissions was five days later, on July 31, 1924.

Suddenly, some shots and explosions were heard from a nearby gorge. Major Kalabalikis, the Greek officer in charge of the region, ordered the arrest of 70 ethnic-Bulgarian peasants from the three villages, suspected as being responsible.

The next day, Sunday July 27, 1924, Kalabalikis ordered his military aide lieutenant Doxakis, a Greek officer from Crete, to transport 27 of the captured villagers to the district administration in Serres for interrogation, via the village of Gorno Brodi.

Doxakis, in charge of 10 Greek soldiers, led the bound captives via a mountain path, bypassing the usually-used road between Tarlis and Gorno Brodi. He returned five hours later to announce that his squad was attacked by Bulgarian guerrillas, and that when the prisoners tried to escape he was forced to kill 17 of them.

Reaction
The Tarlis incident triggered large-scale protests in Bulgaria and an international outcry against Greece. The Mixed Commission for Greek-Bulgarian Emigration investigated the incident and presented its conclusions to the League of Nations in Geneva.

As a result, upon the League of Nations' demand, a bilateral Bulgarian-Greek agreement was signed in Geneva on September 29, 1924, known as the Politis–Kalfov Protocol, recognizing the "Greek slavophones" as ethnic Bulgarians and guaranteeing their protection. Next month, a primer textbook for the ethnic Bulgarian population (in a newly invented Latin-based alphabet and not mentioning the name "Bulgarian"), known as Abecedar, was published by the Greek authorities and introduced to schools of Greek Macedonia.

On February 2, 1925, the Greek parliament, claiming pressure from the Serbs (which had threatened to renounce the 1913 Greco-Serbian alliance treaty), refused to ratify the agreement, which lasted 9 months until June 10, 1925, when the League of Nations annulled it.

See also
 Incident at Petrich

References

Conflicts in 1924
Mass murder in 1924
Bulgaria–Greece relations
Massacres in Greece
1924 in Greece
1924 in Bulgaria
History of Drama, Greece
July 1924 events
League of Nations